Cheshmeh-ye Shirin Shah Ahmad (also Romanized as Cheshmeh-ye Shīrīn Shāh Aḩmad; also known as Cheshmeh-ye Shīrīn) is a village in Abanar Rural District, Kalat District, Abdanan County, Ilam Province, Iran. At the 2006 census, its population was 33, in 4 families. The village is populated by Kurds.

References 

Populated places in Abdanan County
Kurdish settlements in Ilam Province